Raghed Khalil  is a Syrian football defender who played for Syria in the 1984 Asian Cup.

References
Stats

Living people
Syrian footballers
Footballers at the 1982 Asian Games
Competitors at the 1987 Mediterranean Games
Mediterranean Games gold medalists for Syria
1980 AFC Asian Cup players
1984 AFC Asian Cup players
Association football defenders
Mediterranean Games medalists in football
Year of birth missing (living people)
Asian Games competitors for Syria